Computerized Systems Used In Clinical Trials (CSUCT) is a guidance document established by the U.S. Food and Drug Administration in 1999 and revised in 2007. It is legally binding in the United States.

References

External links
Text of the guidance

Food and Drug Administration